Each team in the 2014 FIFA Club World Cup had to name a 23-man squad (three of whom must be goalkeepers) by the FIFA deadline of 28 November 2014. Injury replacements were allowed until 24 hours before the team's first match.

Auckland City

Manager:  Ramon Tribulietx

Cruz Azul

Manager:  Luis Fernando Tena

ES Sétif

Manager:  Kheïreddine Madoui

Moghreb Tétouan

Manager:  Aziz El Amri

Real Madrid

Manager:  Carlo Ancelotti

San Lorenzo

Manager:  Edgardo Bauza

Western Sydney Wanderers

Manager:  Tony Popovic

References

External links
FIFA Club World Cup Morocco 2014 – List of Players, FIFA.com

Squads
FIFA Club World Cup squads